Gwon Sun-cheon (born 24 August 1983) is a South Korean speed skater. He competed in the men's 500 metres event at the 2006 Winter Olympics.

References

1983 births
Living people
South Korean male speed skaters
Olympic speed skaters of South Korea
Speed skaters at the 2006 Winter Olympics
Place of birth missing (living people)